Keensburg is a village in Coffee Precinct, Wabash County, Illinois. The population was 192 at the 2010 census.

History

Keensburg was founded in the mid-1870s, and named for the Keen family.

Geography
Keensburg is connected to the nearby towns of Mount Carmel and Grayville by Illinois Route 1. The village lies just west of the Wabash River and Beall Woods State Park.

Demographics

As of the census of 2000, there were 252 people, 102 households, and 73 families residing in the village. The racial makeup of the village was 99.21% White, and 0.79% from two or more races.

There were 102 households, out of which 26.5% had children under the age of 18 living with them, 64.7% were married couples living together, 6.9% had a female householder with no husband present, and 27.5% were non-families. 21.6% of all households were made up of individuals, and 6.9% had someone living alone who was 65 years of age or older. The average household size was 2.47 and the average family size was 2.91.

In the village, the population was spread out, with 21.4% under the age of 18, 9.5% from 18 to 24, 31.3% from 25 to 44, 27.4% from 45 to 64, and 10.3% who were 65 years of age or older. The median age was 37 years. For every 100 females, there were 104.9 males. For every 100 females age 18 and over, there were 102.0 males.

The median income for a household in the village was $30,375, and the median income for a family was $36,500. Males had a median income of $27,500 versus $18,750 for females. The per capita income for the village was $14,889. About 4.2% of families and 5.6% of the population were below the poverty line, including none of those under the age of eighteen or sixty five or over.

References

Villages in Illinois
Villages in Wabash County, Illinois